Walker is an unincorporated community and census-designated place (CDP) in Mono County, California, United States. The ZIP Code is 96107, and mail to Walker should be addressed Coleville.

The town was likely named for pioneer Joseph R. Walker, who started his ascent of the Sierra Nevada range (as part of a longer expedition which ended in Monterey) in nearby Bridgeport. The Walker area was devastated by the 2020 Mountain View Fire, which resulted in evacuations. The population was 704 at the 2020 census.

Geography
Walker is one of the three northernmost communities in Mono County. It is bordered to the north by Coleville, which in turn is bordered to the north by Topaz. According to the Mono County government, Antelope Valley, including Walker, is expected to see significant population growth.

U.S. Route 395 passes through Walker, leading north  to Carson City, Nevada, and southeast  to Bridgeport, the Mono county seat.

Walker is situated at the south end of the Antelope Valley, drained to the north by the West Walker River.

Fire protection district
Walker is served by the Antelope Valley Fire Protection District, founded in 1947 and covering  of the Antelope Valley. The District's main fire station is located in Walker.

Water district
Portions of Walker are served by the Antelope Valley Water District, which was formed in 1961.

Demographics
The 2010 United States Census reported that Walker had a population of 721. The racial makeup of Walker was 629 (87.2%) White, 3 (0.4%) African American, 57 (7.9%) Native American, 3 (0.4%) Asian, 1 (0.1%) Pacific Islander, 13 (1.8%) from other races, and 15 (2.1%) from two or more races. Hispanic or Latino of any race were 70 persons (9.7%).

The Census reported that 719 people (99.7% of the population) lived in households, 2 (0.3%) lived in non-institutionalized group quarters, and 0 (0%) were institutionalized.

There were 335 households, out of which 73 (21.8%) had children under the age of 18 living in them, 171 (51.0%) were opposite-sex married couples living together, 28 (8.4%) had a female householder with no husband present, 19 (5.7%) had a male householder with no wife present.  There were 23 (6.9%) unmarried opposite-sex partnerships, and 1 (0.3%) same-sex married couples or partnerships. 101 households (30.1%) were made up of individuals, and 51 (15.2%) had someone living alone who was 65 years of age or older. The average household size was 2.15.  There were 218 families (65.1% of all households); the average family size was 2.61.

The population was spread out, with 124 people (17.2%) under the age of 18, 40 people (5.5%) aged 18 to 24, 118 people (16.4%) aged 25 to 44, 243 people (33.7%) aged 45 to 64, and 196 people (27.2%) who were 65 years of age or older.  The median age was 51.1 years. For every 100 females, there were 95.4 males.  For every 100 females age 18 and over, there were 90.7 males.

There were 445 housing units at an average density of 24.1 per square mile (9.3/km), of which 231 (69.0%) were owner-occupied, and 104 (31.0%) were occupied by renters. The homeowner vacancy rate was 4.5%; the rental vacancy rate was 16.0%.  488 people (67.7% of the population) lived in owner-occupied housing units and 231 people (32.0%) lived in rental housing units.

References

See also
 Topaz Lake

Census-designated places in Mono County, California
Census-designated places in California